This is a list of countries and dependencies ranked by population density, measured by the number of human inhabitants per square kilometre or square mile, and also sortable by total area and by population. The list includes sovereign states and self-governing dependent territories based upon the ISO standard ISO 3166-1. The list also includes unrecognized but de facto independent countries. The figures in the following table are based on areas including internal bodies of water such as bays, lakes, reservoirs and rivers. The list does not include entities not on ISO 3166-1, except for states with limited recognition. Thus constituent countries that are not included on ISO 3166-1, and other entities not on ISO 3166-1 like the European Union, are not included. Figures used in this article are mainly based on the latest censuses and official estimates or projections. Where these are unavailable, projections provided by the Population Division of the United Nations Department of Economic and Social Affairs are used.

Main table 
Areas and populations sourced from the United Nations, unless otherwise noted.

Note: Data unavailable for Abkhazia, Akrotiri and Dhekelia, Somaliland, and South Ossetia.

Most populous countries by density 
The table below is the subset of the above, restricted to countries with at least 7,500,000 people (see also List of countries and dependencies by population).

Gridded population

Notes

References 

Human overpopulation
Density
 
Countries and dependencies
Population geography
Eurasia
Africa
Americas
Oceania